The 2011 Chinese Taipei Figure Skating Championships took place between 14 and 15 August 2010 at the Taipei Arena in Taipei. Skaters competed in the disciplines of men's singles and ladies' singles on the senior, junior, and novice levels.

Senior results

Men

Ladies

Junior results

Men

Ladies

Novice results

Boys

Girls

References

External links
 Results
 Competitors list
 Chinese Taipei Figure Skating

2011
2011 in figure skating
2010 in figure skating